Saxon language may refer to:

 Old Saxon, a Germanic language and the earliest recorded form of Low German
Middle Saxon, a language that is the descendant of Old Saxon and the ancestor of modern Low German
Low Saxon language or Low German, modern successor language of Old Saxon
 Anglo-Saxon language or Old English, the ancestor of modern English
 West Saxon dialect, one of the four main dialects of Old English
 Upper Saxon German, an East Central German dialect spoken in much of the modern German State of Saxony
 Transylvanian Saxon dialect, dialect of the Transylvanian Saxons in the Moselle Franconian group of West Central German dialects

See also 
 Saxon (disambiguation)
 Anglo-Frisian languages